PTQ may refer to:

 PTQ implant, a type of bio-compatible injectable bulking agent used in urinary and fecal incontinence
 Pro Tour Qualifier, a Pro Tour event held in professional Magic: The Gathering  trading card game competitions